Crugmeer (great barrow) is a hamlet in north Cornwall, England, United Kingdom. It is situated one-and-a-half miles (2 kilometres) from Padstow to the west of the River Camel estuary.

The hamlet consists of half-a-dozen houses and a farm at the junction of two lanes. One lane gives access to Crugmeer from the Padstow-St Merryn road then continues northeast to Lellizzick, Hawker's Cove and Stepper Point. The other lane leads west from Crugmeer to Trevone beach.

Crugmeer lies within the Cornwall Area of Outstanding Natural Beauty (AONB). Almost a third of Cornwall has AONB designation, with the same status and protection as a National Park.

References

External links

Hamlets in Cornwall
Padstow